James P. Hannan (July 5, 1918October 1987) was a Michigan politician.

Early life
Hannan was born in Buffalo, New York on July 5, 1918. Hannan graduated from elementary school in Golden, Colorado and from high school in Milan, Michigan. Hannan earned a Bachelor of Laws from Wayne State University.

Military career
Hannan served in the United States Army during World War II.

Career
Hannan was a lawyer. On November 2, 1948, Hannan was elected to the position of member of the Michigan Senate from the 18th district. He was sworn in on January 5, 1949 and served until 1950. Hannan was an unsuccessful candidate in the Democratic primary for the position of member of the United States House of Representatives from Michigan's 17th district in 1952.

Death
Hannan died in October 1987. His last residence was Pearce, Arizona.

References

1918 births
1987 deaths
Politicians from Buffalo, New York
Military personnel from Michigan
United States Army personnel of World War II
Democratic Party Michigan state senators
Michigan lawyers
Wayne State University alumni
20th-century American politicians
20th-century American lawyers